The 2002–03 Vermont Catamounts season was their first season in the ECAC Division I. Led by head coach Dennis Miller, the Catamounts had 3 victories, compared to 25 defeats and 2 ties. Their conference record was 0 victories, 15 defeats and 1 tie.

Regular season

Schedule

References

Vermont Catamounts Women's Ice Hockey Season, 2002-03
Vermont Catamounts women's ice hockey seasons
Cata
Cata